Paonias myops, the small-eyed sphinx, is a moth of the family Sphingidae. The species was first described by James Edward Smith in 1797.

Distribution 
It is found from south-eastern Canada to Florida and westward almost to the Pacific Coast. It is also known from Mexico.

Description 
The wingspan is 52–69 mm. Adults are more nocturnal than most sphingids; after an initial bout of activity after dusk, they fly throughout the night. Adults are on wing from June to September in eastern Canada. In New Jersey, there are two generations per year and there are four generations in Louisiana.

Subspecies
Paonias myops myops
Paonias myops occidentalis Clark, 1919 (Mexico)

References

 Fullard, James H. & Napoleone, Nadia (2001): Diel flight periodicity and the evolution of auditory defences in the Macrolepidoptera. Animal Behaviour 62(2): 349–368.  PDF fulltext

External links

Midnight racer on National Geographic.

Paonias
Moths described in 1797
Moths of North America